Lee Sam-seop (born 19 March 1970) is a South Korean paralympic badminton player. He participated at the 2020 Summer Paralympics in the badminton competition, being awarded the silver medal in the men's singles WH1 event.

Achievements

Paralympic Games 
Men's singles

World Championships
Men's singles

Men's doubles

Mixed doubles

Asian Para Games 
Men's singles

Men's doubles

Mixed doubles

Asian Championships 
Men's singles

Men's doubles

Mixed doubles

BWF Para Badminton World Circuit (1 title) 
The BWF Para Badminton World Circuit – Grade 2, Level 1, 2 and 3 tournaments has been sanctioned by the Badminton World Federation from 2022.

Men's doubles

International Tournaments (21 titles, 12 runners-up) 
Men's singles

Men's doubles

Mixed doubles

References

External links 
Paralympic Games profile

Notes 

Living people
Place of birth missing (living people)
South Korean male badminton players
Paralympic silver medalists for South Korea
Paralympic medalists in badminton
Badminton players at the 2020 Summer Paralympics
Medalists at the 2020 Summer Paralympics
1970 births